Özdemir is a Turkish given name for males meaning "pure iron." It may refer to:

Given name
 Özdemir Pasha (died 1561), Circassian Mamluk general for the Ottoman Empire
 Özdemir Sabancı (1941–1996), Turkish businessman
 Ozdemir Turan (born 1950), Turkish acrobat

Surname
 Ali Talip Özdemir (born 1953), Turkish politician and former leader of the Motherland Party
 Burak Özdemir (born 1994), Turkish chef and restaurateur
Cansu Özdemir (born 1988), German politician of Kurdish descent
 Cem Özdemir (born 1965), German politician of Turkish descent
 Demet Özdemir (born 1992), Turkish actress, model and dancer
 Cüneyt Özdemir (born 1970), Turkish journalist
 Emre Ozdemir (born 1981), Turkish cartoonist and illustrator
 Enes Özdemir (born 2002), Turkish karateka
 Evren Ozdemir (born 1977, Turkish-Canadian rapper, producer and songwriter
 Hasan Özdemir (born 1947), Turkish former police chief and politician
 Hasan Özdemir (footballer) (born 1964), Turkish footballer
 İbrahim Özdemir (born 1960), Turkish philosopher
 İlkay Özdemir (born 1981), Turkish female performer of stage magic
 Mahinur Ozdemir (born 1982), Belgian politician
 Mahmut Özdemir (born 1987), German politician of Turkish descent
 Nihat Özdemir (born 1950), Turkish businessman
 Nilay Özdemir (born 1985), Turkish female volleyball player
 Oktay Özdemir (born 1986),Turkish-German actor
 Pervin Özdemir (born 1951), Turkish female ceramics artist
 Serkan Özdemir (born 1976), Turkish football player
 Seçkin Özdemir (born 1981), Turkish actor

Places
 Özdemir, Elmalı, a village in the Elmalı district of the Antalya Province of Turkey
 Panik, Turkey, a town in the Iğdır Merkez district of the Iğdır Province of Turkey known as Özdemir before 2014

Turkish-language surnames
Turkish masculine given names